Nemescu is a Romanian surname that may refer to:

Cristian Nemescu
Octavian Nemescu

Romanian-language surnames